Sadanam Divakara Marar was an Indian percussionist, known for his scholarship on sopana sangeetham, marappani, parisha vadhyam and thimila paani and his mastery over various temple and ritual percussion instruments of traditional Kerala music.

Biography

Divakara Marar was born on 29 April 1937, to Venkittaramanan Embranthiri and Parukutti Marasyar Amma at Pazhoor, a small hamlet near the town of Piravom, Ernakulam district, in the south Indian state of Kerala. Marar started learning music at the age of nine, under the tutelage of his uncles, Narayana Marar and Kunjikrishna Marar. Later, aged 18, he enrolled at Unnayi Warrier Smaraka Kalanilayam, Irinjalakuda, a known Kathakali institution and mastered chenda, under the guidance of Alankarathu Appu Marar. He, then, submitted himself to advanced training on chenda under the renowned chenda exponent, Chandra Mannadiar. This was followed by his training stint on thayambaka at Peroor Gandhi Seva Sadanam, which added the prefix of Sadanam to his name.

He was married to Omana and the couple had two daughters, Radhika and Rethika, and a son, Rajesh. Divakara Marar died on 29 July 2014, at his residence in Tripunithura, due to age related illnesses.

Career

Divakara Marar began his career as a teacher at RLV College of Music and Fine Arts, Tripunithura, where he taught kathakali chenda. He also taught many disciples through Padana kalaris (short term teaching camps), too. He retired as the Principal of Vaikkom Kshethra Kalapeetom run by Travancore Devaswom Board. He remained a visiting professor at the institute and was active teaching at Ernakulam Siva Kshethra Vadhya Kalalayam and Kanayannoor Vadhya Kalalayam till his death.

Marar has performed at many temples and festivals in Kerala throughout his career. He was also actively associated with the Viswa Kala Kendra of Guru Gopinath, See India Foundation and International Kathakali Kendra (International Centre for Kathakali), New Delhi, throughout his career.

Awards and recognitions
Divakara Marar has received many awards and recognitions, a few of which are:
 Kendra Sangeet Natak Akademi * Fellowship – Department of Culture, Government of India
 Vadya Kala Visaradh – Travancore Devaswom Board
 Veera Srungala (Gold Armband) of Kerala Kalamandalam

See also
 Neralattu Rama Poduval
 Kuzhur Narayana Marar
 Guru Gopinath
 Panchavadyam
 Thayambaka
 Panchari melam
 Pandi melam

External links
 Tribute – Part One
 Tribute – Part Two
 Temple performance on YouTube
 Tribute page of a student
 News report
 Blog report

References

1937 births
2014 deaths
Indian music educators
Indian percussionists
Malayali people
People from Ernakulam district
20th-century Indian musicians